The Fender G-DEC (Guitar Digital Entertainment Center) is a family of "teaching" and practice amplifiers, manufactured by Fender Musical Instruments Corporation, that all feature amp modelling and effects, drum/bass patterns, teaching and performance backing loops, internal synth with MIDI interface, tuner, phrase sampler. All amps are capable of reproducing convincing guitar tones from heavy metal to jazz to punk to country at the twist of a knob. The range of special effects available are wide ranging and connection to a computer via the MIDI interface is possible.

There are several different amplifiers to suit a range of budgets:
 The original G-DEC is a 15 watt device with an 8" speaker.
 The G-DEC Exec is a 15 watt amplifier with an 8" speaker but in three-color Sunburst maple cabinet, with an oxblood grille cloth and various accessories.
 G-DEC Junior is a 15 watt amplifier with an 8" speaker but sporting a simplified, stripped down control interface.
 G-DEC 30 is an updated version of the G-DEC with more power, bigger 10" speaker, more effects, more memory for MIDI data.
 G-DEC 3 is current (introduced in North America Jan 2010 and released to Europe May 2010) and has different features to the original. Most notable change is the addition of MP3/WAV file playback, USB connectivity instead of MIDI and Fender FUSE software to program the amp from PC or MAC. This newer model comprises two versions; the "G-DEC3 Fifteen" 15 watt and the "G-DEC3 Thirty" 30 watt. The latter has stereo line outs for connectivity to sound reinforcement equipment.

There is also an amplifier for bass players called B-DEC 30 (Bass Digital Entertainment Center). This has similar features to the G-DEC 30 but tailored for the lower bass guitar frequencies. It has a 10" speaker and a piezo horn tweeter. Also it differs from the other amplifiers as it is angled like a wedge-shaped foldback speaker.

The G-DEC3 Thirty was offered in 3 special editions in addition to the standard edition; the G-DEC3 Blues Edition, the G-DEC3 Metal Edition and the G-DEC3 Country Edition, each with a selection of standard plus their own unique WAV tracks particular to the music style.

References

Fender amplifiers